John Bence may refer to:
 John Bence (1622–1688), English merchant and politician, 
 John Bence (1670–1718), English politician, MP for Ipswich, and for Dunwich
 John Bence (1581–1635), MP for Aldeburgh